Events from the year 1987 in Taiwan, Republic of China. This year is numbered Minguo 76 according to the official Republic of China calendar.

Incumbents
 President – Chiang Ching-kuo
 Vice President – Lee Teng-hui
 Premier – Yu Kuo-hwa
 Vice Premier – Lin Yang-kang, Lien Chan

Events

March
 7 March – 1987 Lieyu Massacre in Kinmen County.

June
 8 June - Yu Kuo-hwa and his wife visit Singapore.
 12 June - Yu Kuo-hwa and his wife left Singapore.

July
 1 July – The establishment of National College of Physical Education and Sports in Taoyuan County.
 15 July – Martial law lifted by President Chiang Ching-kuo.

August
 1 August – The establishment of Council of Labor Affairs.
 22 August – The renaming of Environmental Protection Bureau to become the Environmental Protection Administration.

Births
 25 February – Mai Chia-je, baseball player
 8 March – Lin Chih-hsiang, baseball player
 19 March – Enno Cheng, singer, actress, writer
 24 March – Eve Ai, singer and songwriter
 8 April – Rachel Liang, singer
 10 April – Sandrine Pinna, actress
 2 May – Esther Yang, actress
 15 May – Chang Chih-hao, baseball player
 25 May – Jenna Wang, actress
 23 August – Tsai Yi-chen, actress
 17 September – Yang Ko-han, actress and producer
 9 October – Emily Hung, actress
 13 October – Teresa Lu, golf athlete
 2 November – Lin Chiung-ying, football and futsal player
 13 November – Lu Hsueh-mei, softball athlete
 15 November – Mini Tsai, singer
 20 November – Andrea Chen, model and actress
 22 November – Yeh Tzu-cheng, swimming athlete

Deaths
 17 January – Gu Zhutong, Chief of the General Staff (1948–1950).
 21 October – He Yingqin, general.

References

 
Years of the 20th century in Taiwan